The 1975–76 Football League season was Birmingham City Football Club's 73rd in the Football League and their 42nd in the First Division. They were in the bottom four from mid-October onwards, and eventually finished in 19th position in the 22-team division, one place above the relegation positions. They entered the 1975–76 FA Cup at the third round proper and lost to Portsmouth in that round after a replay, and lost to Wolverhampton Wanderers in the third round of the League Cup. To celebrate the centenary of the club's foundation in 1875, they played a friendly match against Celtic, winning 1–0.

Twenty-seven players made at least one first-team appearance, and there were thirteen different goalscorers. Defender Joe Gallagher missed only one of the 46 competitive matches played over the season, and Trevor Francis was the club's leading scorer with 18 goals, all but one scored in the league.

Keith Coombs took over the chairmanship following the death of his father Clifford.

Football League First Division

League table (part)

FA Cup

League Cup

Centenary match

Appearances and goals

Numbers in parentheses denote appearances as substitute.
Players with name struck through and marked  left the club during the playing season.
Players with names in italics and marked * were on loan from another club for the whole of their season with Birmingham.

See also
Birmingham City F.C. seasons

References
General
 
 
 Source for match dates and results: 
 Source for lineups, appearances, goalscorers and attendances: Matthews (2010), Complete Record, pp. 386–87.
 Source for centenary match details: Matthews (1995), Complete Record, p. 243.
Specific

Birmingham City F.C. seasons
Birmingham City